This list of ships of the Republic of Vietnam Navy, commonly known as the Vietnam Navy (VNN),  includes all ships commissioned into service from its foundation in 1955, until its dissolution in 1975.

Hull numbers
All VNN ship hull numbers began with the letters HQ (Hải quân, "Navy") followed by a number. Note that six patrol craft were designated HQ-01 to HQ-06, while two destroyer escorts and four high endurance cutters were designated HQ-1 to HQ-6. Also the designation HQ-225 was used twice, first for the LSSL Nguyen Van Tru from 1954 until 1957, and after it was broken up for spare parts was given to the LSSL Nỏ Thần, later renamed Nguyen Van Tru in 1970.

Patrol craft

These s were 280 ton,  vessels, with a crew of 65. The main armament was one 3"/50 caliber gun, along with 40 mm and 20 mm guns.

Destroyer escort

The  was a 1,253-ton,  vessel, with a crew of 186. The main armament was three 3"/50 caliber guns, along with torpedo tubes, depth charges, and 40 mm and 20 mm guns.

Frigate

Originally built as s for the U.S. Navy, these 2,040 ton,  vessels were transferred to the Coast Guard after World War II, and reclassified as s. The main armament was a single 5"/38 caliber gun. In Vietnamese service they were classified as frigates.

Patrol craft escort

The Patrol Craft Escorts were 903 ton,  vessels. The main armament was a single 3"/50 caliber gun, along with 40 mm guns, and depth charges.

Minesweeper

Fleet minesweeper

The s were 625 ton,  ships. The main armament was a single 3"/50 caliber gun, along with 40 mm guns, and depth charges.

Harbor minesweeper
The YMS-1-class auxiliary motor minesweepers were 270 ton,  vessels. The main armament was a single 3"/50 caliber gun, along with 20 mm guns, and depth charges.

Coastal minesweeper

These vessels were built for South Vietnam by Stephens Brothers, Inc., Stockton, California, and were assigned hull numbers, but not commissioned into the United States Navy. They were 370 ton,  vessels. Their only armament was two 20 mm guns.

Motor Launch Minesweeper
The motor launch minesweeper (MLMS) was a 40 to 60 foot motor launch fitted with basic minesweeping equipment suitable for clearing river channels and harbours.

Landing Ship Support Large
The Landing Ship Support (Large) (LSSL) were 250 ton,  amphibious assault ships primarily used to provide close fire support for troops. The main armament was a single 3"/50 caliber gun, along with 40 mm and 20 mm guns, and .50 caliber machine guns.

USS LSIL-710 was also transferred to South Vietnam in 1956, but its name and number are not recorded.

Landing Ship Infantry (Large)
Landing Ship Infantry (Large) (LSIL) were 234 ton,  amphibious assault ships, designed to land large numbers of troops directly onto beaches. It could transport 188 men and 65 tons of cargo. Armament consisted of five single 20 mm guns, with additional .50 caliber machine guns.

Landing Ship Medium - Hospital
The LSM-1-class Landing Ship Medium (LSM-H) were amphibious assault ships designed to carry men and vehicles onto a hostile shore. In this case they were modified to act as hospital ships.

Landing Ship Medium

The LSM-1-class Landing Ship Medium (LSM) were amphibious assault ships designed to carry men and vehicles onto a hostile shore. They were capable of carrying between three and five tanks, and 54 troops. Their armament consisted of two 40 mm guns, and four 20 mm guns.

Two further ships - USS LSM-355 and USS LSM-58 - were also transferred to the VVN, though their names and numbers are unknown.
 USS LSM-58 was transferred to South Vietnam in April 1956,  but was returned to U.S. custody on 29 May 1956.
 USS LSM-355 was transferred to South Vietnam in December 1955, escaped to the Philippines on 30 April 1975, and served in the Philippine Navy until 1989.

Gasoline barge
The YOG-5-class self-propelled gasoline barge was a 1,235-ton,  vessel, with a crew of 23.

Water Barge

Refrigerated Covered Lighter
This 300 ton,  vessel was used to transport food supplies to floating barracks and bases. They had a crew of 17 and were unarmed.

Note: YFR-889 is one of two of the type deployed to Vietnam according to Navsource. The other, YFR-888, was struck in 1985, and disposed of in 1987, according to the NVR database.

Landing Ship Tank

The Landing Ship, Tank (LST) was a vessel created to support amphibious operations by landing vehicles, cargo, and troops directly to shore. It could transport 140 troops and between 1,600 and 1,900 tons of cargo in the form of various vehicles, as well as six LCVPs. The main armament was a single 3"/50 caliber gun, along with a number of 40 mm and 20 mm guns, and .50  and .30 caliber machine guns.

Landing Craft Utility
Landing Craft Utility  (LCU) were 314 ton,  amphibious assault ships designed to land tanks on beachheads. They were originally classified as the Mk.6 LCT. They were capable of carrying three or four medium or heavy tanks, or 150 tons of cargo, while armament consisted of two twin 20 mm guns and two .50 caliber machine guns.

Harbor Salvage Craft
The Salvage Lift Craft, Light (YLLC), was a 400-ton,  salvage craft with a lift capacity of 25 tons, based on the hull of the Mk.6  Tank landing craft.

Patrol Gunboat Medium
The PGM-9-class gunboats were built in the U.S. and transferred on completion to South Vietnam. They were assigned hull numbers, but not commissioned into the United States Navy.

Patrol boat

The Point-class cutter was a 70-ton,  patrol vessel. Armament consisted of five M2 Browning machine guns and an 81 mm mortar.

The ships were transferred to the VNN under the United States Coast Guard's SCATTOR (Smallcraft Assets: Training/Turnover Of Resources) program; numerically they were the largest class of the VNN. By 1972, most were in poor condition and mothballed due to lack of fuel and spares. Ngô Văn Quyền (HQ-718) was still active and in good condition when South Vietnam fell in 1975, she was taken into the Vietnam People's Navy and served for many more years. A few other Point-class ships reportedly participated in a final defense of Saigon, firing at North Vietnamese troops from the Saigon River in April 1975. Some may have been damaged or sunk in action. Huỳnh Văn Đức (HQ-702) rendezvoused with other surviving South Vietnamese warships off Côn Sơn Island and fled to the Philippines, and was scrapped there. The rest of the former South Vietnamese fleet was presumably scrapped by Vietnam in the early 1980s.

Patrol Craft Tender
These ships were built as LST-542-class tank landing ships (LST) and modified to act as tenders for patrol craft flotillas.

Landing Craft Repair Ship
The  (ARL) was a mobile repair ship based on the same hull as the LST. Armament consisted of two quad and two twin 40 mm guns, and six twin 20 mm guns.

Armored Troop Carriers, Monitors and ASPBs

The Armored Troop Carrier (ATC), better known as the "Tango boat", were LCM-6 landing craft modified for riverine patrol missions. The front ramps were retained for loading and offloading troops, and an armoured superstructure was added. They were 66 ton,  vessels, with a crew of 7.

The Monitor was a heavily armed gunboat, initially equipped with a  cannon and an  mortar. Later variants included  the "Zippo" equipped with flamethrowers and another with a  howitzer mounted in a bow turret. The "Charlie" command and control boat had a communications module midships in place of the mortar well.

The Assault Support Patrol Boat (ASPB), known as the "Alpha Boat" was a  patrol boat armed with two Mk 16 20 mm guns or one Mk 16 and two .50 Browning machine guns, with eight 3.5-inch rocket launchers (on forward turret), and two Mk 21 7.62mm Brownings aft.

Repair, Berthing and Messing Barge
The YRBM-16-class Repair, Berthing and Messing Barge was a 2,700-ton, 261 foot vessel designed to provide support and accommodation for riverine forces.

Junks & Miscellaneous Craft 

In January 1972, there were approximately 250 motorised junks in service with the RVN, with very few, if any, armed sailing junks remaining. In addition, on 25 September 1971, USCGC WLV-523, a lightship, was transferred to South Vietnam in order to supplement the coastal naval radar stations already in use. It was renamed Da Bong (304).

References
Notes

Bibliography

 This article incorporates material translated from the corresponding page in the Vietnamese Wikipedia.

Ships of the Republic of Vietnam Navy